The Shawmut Historic District, in Valley, Alabama, is a historic district which was listed on the National Register of Historic Places in 1999. It is roughly bounded by 25th Boulevard, 29th Boulevard, 20th Ave., 35th St., and 38th Boulevard.

It includes work by the Lockwood, Greene & Company.

Architecture: Bungalow/craftsman, depression modern

Historic function: Domestic; Commerce/trade; Recreation And Culture; Landscape; Industry/processing/extraction; Government; Education
Historic subfunction: Single Dwelling; Specialty Store; Professional; Sport Facility; Park; Manufacturing Facility; Post Office
Criteria: event, architecture/engineering

References

Historic districts on the National Register of Historic Places in Alabama
National Register of Historic Places in Chambers County, Alabama